Chattaphong Pantana-Angkul (or Chatthapong Pantanaunkul, also known as Lewis Phantana, b. April 8, 1971 in Bangkok) is a Thai actor and martial artist. His films include Ong-Bak: Muay Thai Warrior and Born to Fight.

Filmography 
 999-9999 (2002)
 Ong-Bak: Muay Thai Warrior (2003)
 Club zaa: Pit tamraa saep (คลับซ่า ปิดตำราแสบ) (2004)
 Lizard Woman (Tuk kae phii) (2004)
 Be Very Quiet (2004) ... Pimp
 Born to Fight (2004)
 Taepung (Typhoon) (2005)

External links
 

1971 births
Living people
Chattapong Pantana-Angkul
Chattapong Pantana-Angkul
Chattapong Pantana-Angkul
Chattapong Pantana-Angkul